Joseph Papp (born Joseph Papirofsky; June 22, 1921 – October 31, 1991) was an American theatrical producer and director. He established The Public Theater in what had been the Astor Library Building in Lower Manhattan. There Papp created a year-round producing home to focus on new plays and musicals. Among numerous examples of these were the works of David Rabe, Ntozake Shange's For Colored Girls Who Have Considered Suicide When the Rainbow Is Enuf, Charles Gordone's No Place to Be Somebody (the first off-Broadway play to win the Pulitzer Prize), and Papp's production of Michael Bennett's Pulitzer Prize–winning musical A Chorus Line. Papp also founded Shakespeare in the Park, helped to develop other off-Broadway theatres and worked to preserve the historic Broadway Theatre District.

Early life
Papp was born as Joseph Papirofsky in the Brooklyn borough of New York City, the son of Yetta (née Miritch), a seamstress, and Samuel Papirofsky, a trunkmaker. His parents were Jewish immigrants from Russia. (The 2010 documentary film Joe Papp in Five Acts says his mother was a Lithuanian Jew, and his father a Polish Jew.) He was a high school student of Harlem Renaissance playwright Eulalie Spence. Papp was also the uncle of choreographer turned music video director Diane Martel.

Career
Papp founded the New York Shakespeare Festival (now called Shakespeare in the Park) in 1954 with the aim of making Shakespeare's works accessible to the public. In 1957 he was granted the use of Central Park for free productions of Shakespeare's plays. These Shakespeare in the Park productions continue after his death at the open-air Delacorte Theatre every summer in Central Park.

Founder of the Public Theater 

Papp spent much of his career promoting his idea of free Shakespeare in New York City. His 1956 production of Taming of the Shrew, outdoors in the East River Amphitheatre on New York's Lower East Side, was pivotal for Papp, primarily because critic Brooks Atkinson endorsed Papp's vision in The New York Times. Actress Colleen Dewhurst, who played the leading character, Kate, recalled the effect of this publicity (in an autobiography published posthumously as a collaboration with Tom Viola): 

By age 41, after Papp had established a permanent base for his free summer Shakespeare performances in Central Park's Delacorte Theater, an open-air amphitheatre, Papp looked for an all-year theater he could make his own. After looking at other locations, he fell in love with the location and the character of Lafayette Street's Astor Library. Papp rented it, in 1967, reportedly for one dollar per year, from the city. It was the first building saved from demolition under the New York City landmarks preservation law. After massive renovations, Papp moved his staff to the newly named Public Theater, hoping to attract a newer, less conventional audience for new and innovative playwrights.

At the Public Theater, Papp's focus moved away from the Shakespeare classics and toward new work. Notable Public Theater productions included Charles Gordone's No Place to Be Somebody (the first off-Broadway show, and the first play by an African American, to win the Pulitzer Prize) and the plays of David Rabe, Tom Babe and Jason Miller. Papp called his productions of Rabe's plays "the most important thing I did at the Public. Papp's 1985 production of Larry Kramer's play The Normal Heart addressed, in its time, the prejudicial political system which was turning its back on the AIDS crisis and the gay community. Designer Ming Cho Lee commented: "With the new playwrights, the whole direction of the theater changed [but] none of us realized for a while. ... The Public Theater became more important than the Delacorte. The new playwrights became more interesting to Joe than Shakespeare."

Among all the plays and musicals that Papp produced, he is perhaps best known for four productions that later transferred to Broadway runs: Hair, The Pirates of Penzance, For Colored Girls Who Have Considered Suicide / When the Rainbow Is Enuf and A Chorus Line. The last of these originated with a series of taped interviews, at the Public, of dancers' reminiscences, overseen by director/choreographer Michael Bennett. Papp had not kept the rights to produce Hair, and he did not gain from its Broadway transfer. But he kept the rights to A Chorus Line, and the show's earnings became a continuous financial support for Papp's work. It received 12 Tony Award nominations and won nine of them, including Best Musical, in addition to the 1976 Pulitzer Prize for Drama. It ran for 6,137 performances, becoming the longest-running production in Broadway history up to that time. The show pioneered the workshop system for developing musicals, revolutionizing the way Broadway musicals were created thereafter, and many of the precedents for workshops' aesthetics and contract agreements were set by Papp, Bennett and A Chorus Line.

Outdoor performances at the Delacorte Theatre 

Delacorte Theatre productions introduced many new actors and actresses to outdoor Shakespeare and to New York audiences for free. Among the memorable performances (including some from before Papp had the Delacorte for his Shakespeare) were George C. Scott's Obie-award-winning Richard III in 1958; Colleen Dewhurst's Kate, Lady Macbeth, Cleopatra (opposite George C. Scott's Mark Antony), and Gertrude; the Prince Hamlet of Stacy Keach opposite Dewhurst's Gertrude with James Earl Jones' King Claudius, Barnard Hughes's Polonius and Sam Waterston's Laertes; Sam Waterston's Hamlet (opposite the Gertrude of Ruby Dee) with the Laertes of John Lithgow and Andrea Marcovicci's Ophelia; the Benedick and Beatrice of Sam Waterston and Kathleen Widdoes in Much Ado About Nothing with Barnard Hughes's Keystone Kops version of Dogberry; the early work of Meryl Streep as Isabella in Measure for Measure; Mary Beth Hurt as Randall Duk Kim's daughter in Pericles; James Earl Jones as King Lear (1973) with Rosalind Cash and Ellen Holly as his wicked daughters; Raul Julia as Edmund in Jones' 1973 King Lear, as Osric to Keach's Hamlet, and as Proteus (in a musical adaptation of Two Gentlemen of Verona which transferred to a Broadway run). Julia also played Othello with Frances Conroy as his Desdemona and Richard Dreyfuss as Iago. And, in 1968, one year before his breakthrough in The Subject was Roses, Martin Sheen played Romeo. A complete list of the productions through 1995 is available in Joe Papp: An American Life by Helen Epstein.

Shakespeare in the Park was not exclusively for Shakespeare. In the summer of 1977 Gloria Foster was Clytemnestra in the Greek tragedy Agamemnon followed by Raul Julia as Macheath in Richard Foreman's production of Bertolt Brecht/Kurt Weill's The Threepenny Opera, which later transferred to Lincoln Center. Papp was also a Gilbert and Sullivan lover, and in 1980, to commemorate the centenary of The Pirates of Penzance, he mounted a new staging of the opera at the Delacorte. The show was a sensation, and Papp transferred it to Broadway, where it ran for over 800 performances. It won Tony Awards for Best Revival, Best Director (Wilford Leach), and Best Actor (Kevin Kline). Linda Ronstadt was nominated for Best Actress in a Musical.

Papp was a pioneer in a commitment to non-traditional casting, using a variety of ethnicities and colors of actors in his new plays and Shakespeare productions. The father of a gay son, Tony, Papp aligned himself with gay and lesbian concerns in at least two specific instances. He fought anti-obscenity provisions that Congress briefly imposed on the National Endowment for the Arts during the Reagan Presidency, and he chose to produce The Normal Heart, which decried institutionalized "homophobia" as well as Mayor Koch's response to the AIDS crisis.

Fostering the growth of New York theatre 
Papp fostered other theatre throughout New York City, in particular the development of numerous Off Broadway theatres, often contributing funds from successful Broadway transfers, such as A Chorus Line. These included Theatre for a New Audience, which presented several productions at the Delacourte, and the Riverside Shakespeare Company, in which Papp took a special interest, beginning with the sponsorship of the New York premiere of Brecht's The Life of Edward II of England in 1982, continuing with the financial underwriting of Riverside's New York Parks Tours of Free Shakespeare, including The Comedy of Errors in (1982), Merry Wives of Windsor in 1983, Romeo and Juliet in 1984, and Romeo and Juliet in 1985. In 1983, Papp dedicated the newly renovated theatre of The Shakespeare Center with Helen Hayes.

"Save the Theatres" effort

Papp took a keen interest in preservation of the historic Broadway/Times Square Theater District. In the early 1980s, he helped lead the "Save the Theatres" movement, and to found "Save the Theatres, Inc.", along with a number of actors, directors, producers and other theatre, film and television personalities. The movement's aim was to preserve vintage playhouses that were then being threatened with demolition by monied Manhattan development interests. Papp's initiative was sparked by the impending demolition in 1982 of the historic Morosco and Helen Hayes theatres, as well as the old Piccadilly Hotel, on West 45th Street.

Although Papp was unsuccessful in saving the Morosco or the Helen Hayes, at his encouragement Congressman Donald J. Mitchell of New York introduced legislation in the United States Congress (97th Congress – H.R.6885) with 13 co-sponsors, to designate a "Broadway/Times Square Theatre District National Historic Site" in Manhattan. The Mitchell bill would have required the United States to provide assistance in the preservation of the historical, cultural, and architectural character of the site and in its restoration. It directed the National Park Service to designate theatre preservation sites and other appropriate real property within the site as national historic landmarks if they met the criteria for national historic landmarks, and would have prohibited the demolition or alteration of real property located within the site unless such demolition or alteration would contribute to the preservation, restoration, or enhancement of the site for traditional legitimate theatre purposes. Among other things, it would have established a Federally chartered citizens advisory group to be chaired by Papp, known as the "Broadway/Times Square Theatre District Preservation Commission".

Faced with fierce opposition and extensive lobbying against its passage by Mayor Ed Koch's administration and Manhattan developers, the bill was not enacted into law, but the ultimate effect of the "Save the Theatres" effort was to slow destruction of the old Theater District enough to eventually ensure preservation of a number of other historic playhouses and a measure of the District's original atmosphere and historic character.

Death 
Joseph Papp died of prostate cancer at age 70, on October 31, 1991. He is buried in the Baron Hirsch Cemetery on Staten Island. His son, Tony, died of complications of AIDS only months before Joseph Papp's death. Papp was survived by his fourth wife, Gail Merrifield Papp, a partner in the Public Theatre.

Legacy 
In large part due to the "Save the Theatres" preservation effort led by Papp in the 1980s, the Theater District remains one of New York City's primary and most popular tourist attractions and destinations today.

In 2000 the Joseph Papp Children's Humanitarian Fund was founded. The Fund serves as the humanitarian arm of international Jewish children's club Tzivos Hashem's, activities in the Ukraine. Papp, along with Rabbi Marc Schneier, co-founded the Foundation for Ethnic Understanding to strengthen ties between Blacks and Jews.

Papp's biography Joe Papp: An American Life was written by journalist Helen Epstein and published in 1996.

William Finn's 2003 album Elegies: A Song Cycle includes the song "Joe Papp," dedicated to Papp's contributions to New York theatre and personal friendship with Finn.

Recognition 
 1986: Received the Golden Plate Award of the American Academy of Achievement.
 1992: The Public Theater, home of the New York Shakespeare Festival, renamed the Joseph Papp Public Theater in honor of its founder.
 2017: The intersection of Lafayette Street and Astor Place, the longtime home of Public Theater, co-named in honor of the Public's founder, Joseph Papp.

Further reading

See also 
 Edward Cornell

References

Notes

External links
 Joe Papp Public Theater
 
 
 
 Robert Armin The rally to save the theatres : a chronicle (videorecording)  - New York Public Library
 Robert Armin The rally to save the theatres : a chronicle (videorecording) - via YouTube
"Original videotapes by Robert Armin taken during the rally to save the Morosco and Helen Hayes Theatres in March 1982. This two hour compilation contains complete speeches and play reading excerpts by dozens of Broadway celebrities including Jason Robards, Liza Minnelli, Lauren Bacall, Christopher Reeve, Martha Scott, Comden and Green, Anne Meara, John Rubinstein, Colleen Dewhurst, Geraldine Fitzgerald, Gloria Foster, Carole Shelley, Tammy Grimes, Maureen McGovern, Lee Richardson, Arlene Dahl, Arthur Miller, Jules Feiffer, and Joe Papp"
 Robert Armin Morosco 200 (Save the Theatres 2) (videorecording) - via YouTube
"This 63 minute video was shot during the final Save the Theatres Rally on March 22, 1982 when almost 200 protesters, led by Joe Papp, peacefully trespassed on the empty lot next to the Morosco Theatre on West 45th Street. Each person was courteously loaded into a police van and taken to the Midtown North police station where they received a pink summons to appear later in court. Among the stars present were Susan Sarandon, Richard Gere, Colleen Dewhurst, Dana Delaney, Gary Sandy, Tammy Grimes, Treat Williams, and many more."
 Charles A. Birnbaum, President & CEO, The Cultural Landscape Foundation Nostalgia 2.0: Has Historic Preservation Become a Spectator Sport? - The Huffington Post
Death of a Theater, 1982 – Brooklyn Rail

1921 births
1991 deaths
American theatre managers and producers
American theatre directors
Deaths from prostate cancer
Artists from New York City
American people of Polish-Jewish descent
20th-century American businesspeople